Nelson City may refer to:

 Nelson, British Columbia, a city in Canada
 Nelson City (provincial electoral district), a former electoral district in British Columbia, Canada
 Nelson, New Zealand
 Nelson (New Zealand electorate), formerly known as "City of Nelson"